This is the filmography of Indian actor Jagdeep.

References

Indian filmographies
Male actor filmographies